"No buts!" is the ninth single released by the J-pop singer Mami Kawada. It was released as a single on November 3, 2010 and its title track was later released on the album Square the Circle. The title track is used as the first opening theme for the second season of the anime series A Certain Magical Index. Overall, this is Kawada's fifth tie-in with said anime series.

The single came in a limited CD+DVD edition (GNCV-0027) and a regular edition (GNCV-0028). The DVD contains the promotional video for "No buts!".

Track listing 
No buts!
Lyrics: Mami Kawada
Composition: Tomoyuki Nakazawa
Arrangement: Tomoyuki Nakazawa, Takeshi Ozaki
SATANIC
Lyrics: Mami Kawada
Composition: Tomoyuki Nakazawa
Arrangement: Tomoyuki Nakazawa, Takeshi Ozaki
No buts! (instrumental)
SATANIC (instrumental)

Sales trajectory

References

2010 singles
2010 songs
Mami Kawada songs
A Certain Magical Index music
Anime songs
Japanese-language songs
Songs with lyrics by Mami Kawada
Song recordings produced by I've Sound